is an underground metro station located in Chikusa-ku, Nagoya, Aichi Prefecture, Japan operated by the Nagoya Municipal Subway's Higashiyama Line.  It is located 13.2 rail kilometers from the terminus of the Higashiyama Line at Takabata Station.

History
Kakuōzan Station was opened on 1 April 1963.  The wicket gates were automated to use the Manaca smart card system from 11 February 2011.

This station serves part of the upper class district of Nagoya and is near Kakuōzan Nittai-ji Buddhist temple.

Lines

 (Station number: H15)

Layout
Kakuōzan Station has two underground opposed side platforms.

Platforms

External links
 Kakuōzan Station official web site

References

Chikusa-ku, Nagoya
Railway stations in Japan opened in 1963
Railway stations in Aichi Prefecture